The Sentosa Express is a monorail line connecting Sentosa island to HarbourFront on the Singapore mainland. It was built at a cost of S$140 million to replace the previous Sentosa Monorail. Development began in June 2003 and construction works were completed in December 2006. The fully elevated 2.1-kilometre (1.3-mile; per direction) two-way line (4.3-km total track length) opened on 15 January 2007. The monorail system, privately owned and operated by Sentosa Development Corporation, can move up to 4,000 passengers per hour per direction.

History 

In June 2002, the Sentosa Development Corporation (SDC) awarded a  contract to Japanese subsidiary Hitachi Asia to build the Sentosa Express, which was part of a ten-year redevelopment plan for Sentosa, an offshore island south of the Singapore main island dedicated to tourism. It was to replace the Sentosa Monorail which had been in operation since 1982, with the previous monorail planned for demolition by 2005. Unlike its predecessor which ran in a loop around the island, the Sentosa Express was planned to cross the sea and interchange with the North East Line of the MRT on the mainland, with three stations on Sentosa itself, making up a total of four stations.

Construction of the system began in June 2003, took three and a half years, and was completed in December 2006, costing . Two of three stations on the island, Imbiah and Beach stations, opened with the line on 15 January 2007 along with VivoCity station on the mainland, which had been integrated into the new VivoCity shopping mall.

The third station Waterfront was planned to open in tandem with the then-in development integrated resort Resorts World Sentosa, but was demolished a year later in January 2008 for redevelopment. A spokesman from the Sentosa Leisure Group said that the station had been built before plans for the integrated resort were finalised. The station opened on 1 February 2010 as part of a phased opening of the entire resort complex.

To cater to an increase in passenger traffic, the SDC awarded a  upgrading contract to Hitachi Asia in November 2014. The signalling system was to be upgraded to a communications-based train control system, with the provision of two additional train cars, and to be operational by the end of 2017.

Train timings 
The daily first and last train timings of both VivoCity and Beach stations are 07:00 and 00:00 hours. Trains run at an average frequency of three minutes throughout the day. The entire route, from one terminus to the other, takes eight minutes.

Fares and ticketing 
Travel within Sentosa (between Resorts World and Beach stations) and back to the mainland is free of charge, but travel from the mainland to Sentosa is charged.

The single-day Sentosa Pass costing S$4 allows island entry and unlimited rides on the Sentosa Express. The contactless RFID card can be purchased from automated ticketing machines at any operational Sentosa Express station. Payment can be made using cash, NETS or credit card.

Alternatively, visitors may also scan their CEPAS cards (used for electronic payments on public transport) on VivoCity station's faregates for entry payment from the mainland.

Stations

Legend

 

S$26 million was spent on the elevated stations and the depot next to Beach station. VivoCity station is the only station of the line on the mainland; the rest are on Sentosa. It is also the only one with full-height platform screen doors and a bay platform using the Spanish solution. The other stations on Sentosa island are not air-conditioned and are the first train stations in the country to utilise half height platform screen doors by Fangda.

Like the Mass Rapid Transit, stations have bi-directional escalators and a lift to take passengers from the station concourse to the platforms, except VivoCity station which has both on the same level within VivoCity on the mainland.

VivoCity 
The northern terminus VivoCity station (previously Sentosa @ VivoCity) is just a few levels above HarbourFront MRT station and the nearby HarbourFront Bus Interchange, located within the mall it is named after. Like Changi Airport and Stevens MRT stations, ticketing, faregates and platforms are all on the same level.

The station consists of a single track and a single platform handling Beach-bound trains for turnaround. Like the dismantled Sentosa Monorail stations in the past, it is one of two train stations in Singapore, the other being Choa Chu Kang LRT station, to feature an organised boarding system like the Spanish solution – passengers enter via one side of the train after passengers have alighted on the other side. Doors will open on the left side for passengers to alight, before opening the doors on the right for boarding passengers. This is the only station on the Sentosa Express that is air-conditioned and utilises full-height platform screen doors.

On 1 April 2019, the station was renamed to its present name to better reflect the nearby attractions and to showcase the attractions names.

Resorts World 
Resorts World station is located in the northern region of Sentosa within Resorts World Sentosa. Platform A handles Beach-bound trains, while Platform B handles VivoCity-bound trains. There are two tracks and one island platform. As the line is left-hand drive, all train doors open on the right. It also connects to the Resorts World Sentosa.

The station was originally known as Waterfront and operated for nearly a year before closing down in January 2008, to make way for the construction of Resorts World Sentosa. It was rebuilt and reopened on 1 February 2010. On 1 April 2019, the station was renamed Resorts World after the integrated resort.

Imbiah 
Imbiah station is located in the middle of Sentosa next to Imbiah Lookout. Platform A handles Beach-bound trains, while Platform B handles VivoCity-bound trains. There are two tracks and one island platform. As the line is left-hand drive, all train doors open on the right. The nearest attraction is Madame Tussauds Singapore and the Singapore Cable Car.

Beach 
The southern terminus Beach station is located between Siloso Beach and Palawan Beach at Sentosa. The station consists of a single track and a single Platform A handling VivoCity-bound trains for turnaround.

At the street level, there are beaches, shops, sea sports, pubs, cafés, and restaurants. It is connected to the Beach Station Transfer Hub for transfers to Beach Trams, SBS Transit Bus Service 123, Sentosa Golf Club Shuttle, Shuttle to HarborFront as well as Sentosa Internal Bus Services A, B & C.

The Beach Shuttles run along the Beach to Siloso Beach and Palawan and Tanjong Beaches. The shuttle loops at Siloso Beach and Tanjong Beach respectively. These trams also lay over at the Beach Station Transfer Hub for a short while for drivers to take a break before continuing their trip. The current fleet of these trams are Electric Trams that come in both Articulated and Non-Articulated. The fleet also includes 2 Volvo B12BLEA (Only runs on high peak period like Weekends & Holidays) which are diesel together with several electric trams manufactured by Suzhou Eagle or SPL.

Rolling stock 

The Sentosa Express is the first system to use Hitachi Rail's small-type, straddle–beam monorail with a capacity of about 184 passengers per train. With a total of seven two-car, -long trains of different colours each—namely green, orange, blue, purple, pink, red and yellow; the pink and red trains were added to the original fleet of four on 1 December 2009; the yellow train was added on 24 November 2017. In 2015, the orange train was painted into a multi-coloured livery train. In addition, there are 2 other yellow maintenance trains.

Daily, five monorails are picked to be deployed on the line while the other two remain in the depot.

Signalling 
A switch over from the fixed block Hitachi digital ATP/ATS to the moving block Hitachi wireless CBTC-ATC was conducted in November 2017. The new CBTC system uses wireless communication to gather data on trains' locations and speeds so that the headway between trains can be reduced. This will reduce the travel times for passengers, and allowing more trains to run together for greater capacity. With the implementation of the driverless CBTC system, all train cab windows are opened except during manual operation. Train Captains are still present in the front train cab to manage and monitor the security on the train.

Incidents 
On 23 January 2023, passengers were stuck for close to 2 hours due to a technical issue which saw a monorail train losing power. The train was eventually towed to Resorts World Sentosa station through the use of another monorail train and the passengers were able to safely disembark.

See also 
 Sentosa island
 Sentosa Monorail – a dismantled monorail system that used to ferry visitors around Sentosa from 1982 to 2005
 Rail transport in Singapore

References

External links 

 
 Monorail Society: Sentosa Express Construction Gallery

Monorails
Alweg people movers
Railway lines opened in 2007
2007 establishments in Singapore
Bukit Merah
Express
Rail transport in Singapore
Monorails in Singapore